Conchita Caroline Chairunnisa (born in Jakarta, August 21, 1995) is an Indonesian actress and TV presenter. Conchita also works as a Sportscaster. She hosts Lensa Olahraga on ANTV.

Filmography

Film 

 Oh Baby (2008)

Sinetron 

 Suci
 Dia Bukan Cinderella
 Cinta Intan
 Kasih dan Amara
 Amira
 Hafizah
 Sinar
 Sepakat Untuk Tidak Sepakat
 Tikus Kucing Mencari Cinta Lagi

FTV 

 Balada Cinta Keroncong Batak (2012) as Cindy
 Lucky 17 (2012)
 Cintaku Nenek Ompong (2012)

Music videos 

 Sandiwara Cinta by Repvblik (2012)

Hosting 

 Lensa Olahraga Pagi - ANTV
 Kiss - Indosiar
 ISL - ANTV
 Insert Pagi - Trans TV
 Selebrita - Trans 7
 Kampiun - ANTV
 Sport Zone - RTV
 Serie A - Kompas TV
 Katakan Putus - Trans TV
 Piala Presiden 2015 - Indosiar
 Sapa Indonesia Akhir Pekan - Kompas TV
 Cakep Show - TVRI
 Soccer Magz - inews TV
 Newslog - Metro TV
 Football Inside - Kompas TV
 Copa América Centenario - Kompas TV
 UEFA Europa League - SCTV
 UEFA Champions League - SCTV
 The Next Boy/Girl Band Indonesia - Global TV
 Premier League - MNCTV

Commercials 

 Cap Lang

References

Living people
Indonesian sports journalists
Actresses from Jakarta
1995 births